Emil Richards (born Emilio Joseph Radocchia; September 2, 1932 – December 13, 2019) was an American vibraphonist and percussionist.

Biography

Musician
Richards began playing the xylophone aged six. In High School, he performed with the Hartford Symphony Orchestra. He studied with Al Lepak at the Hartt School of Music in Hartford, graduating in 1952. After being drafted, he belonged to an Army band in Japan and played with Toshiko Akiyoshi. He cited Lionel Hampton as his first and biggest influence on vibraphone.

In 1954, Richards moved to New York City, where he played with Charles Mingus, Ed Shaughnessy, and Ed Thigpen while doing studio recordings for Perry Como, the Ray Charles Singers, and Mitchell Ayres. For about three years, he was a member of a group led by George Shearing, then moved to Los Angeles and worked with Don Ellis and Paul Horn. He led his own band, the Microtonal Blues Band, and spent time with composer and inventor Harry Partch. As a sideman, he accompanied George Harrison on tour and recorded with Frank Sinatra, Frank Zappa, Doris Day, Judy Garland, Nelson Riddle, Steely Dan, and Sarah Vaughan.

Richards worked often as a studio musician for movies and television. His credits include playing bongos on the theme song for the television program Mission: Impossible. Other television work included finger snaps for the Addams Family theme, and xylophone work for the opening theme of The Simpsons. He led a band with Joe Porcaro, and he released a solo album, The Wonderful World of Percussion.

Richards died on December 13, 2019.

Collector

In 1962, Richards went on a worldwide tour with Frank Sinatra to raise money for poor children. The tour increased Richards's fascination with ethnic percussion instruments. During his career, he collected over 350 instruments, many of them more common in the East than the West. Richards wanted his instruments to continue to be heard in recordings and other performances and to remain together as much as possible. The Emil Richards Collection includes common percussion, such as xylophone and marimba and exotic, such as the angklung, bulbul tarang, chimta, flapamba, jal tarang, janggu, lujon, mbira, and pakhavaj.

In 1992, he gave sixty-five instruments to the Percussive Arts Society museum in Lawton, Oklahoma. He was a member of the Society's Hall of Fame. Part of the collection was sold to Los Angeles Percussion Rentals. Many instruments were restored and are used in recordings and other performances in Los Angeles. LAPR works with Odd Art Fabrications to custom design and fabricate instruments and hardware such as chromatically tuned wood blocks and chromatically tuned bell plate.

Discography

As leader
 Yazz Per Favore (Del-fi, 1961)
 New Sound Element Stones (Uni, 1967)
 New Time Element (Uni, 1967)
 Cosmic Sounds with the Zodiac (Elektra, 1967)
 Journey to Bliss (Impulse!, 1968)
 Spirit of 1976/Live at Donte's (Impulse!, 1969)
 Wonderful World of Percussion (Interworld, 1994)
 Luntana (Interworld, 1996)

With The Surfmen
 The Sounds of Exotic Island (Somerset, 1960)
 Hawaii  (Somerset, 1960)

As sideman

With Louis Bellson
 Ecue (Ritmos Cubanos) (Pablo, 1978)
 Prime Time (Concord Jazz, 1978)
 Louie Bellson Jam (Pablo, 1979)

With Alessi Brothers
 Alessi (A&M, 1976)

With Frank Capp
 Percussion in a Tribute to Henry Mancini (Kimberly, 1961)
 Percussion in a Tribute to Glenn Miller (Kimberly, 1963)
 Percussion in a Tribute to Lawrence Welk (Kimberly, 1963)
 In a Tribute to the Dorsey Brothers (Kimberly, 2010)
 In a Tribute to Count Basie (Kimberly, 2014)

With George Duke
 I Love the Blues, She Heard My Cry (MPS, 1975)
 Liberated Fantasies (MPS, 1976)
 From Me to You (Epic, 1977)

With Michael Giacchino
 Coco (Walt Disney, 2017)
 Spider-Man: Homecoming (Sony, 2017)
 War for the Planet of the Apes (Sony, 2017)

With George Harrison
 Dark Horse (Apple, 1974)
 Thirty Three & 1/3 (Dark Horse, 1976)
 George Harrison (Dark Horse, 1979)

With Paul Horn
 Something Blue (HiFi Jazz 1960)
 The Sound of Paul Horn (Columbia, 1961)
 Profile of a Jazz Musician (Columbia, 1962)
 Impressions of Cleopatra (Columbia, 1963)
 Jazz Suite on the Mass Texts (RCA, Victor, 1965)

With James Newton Howard
 Off Limits (Varese Sarabande, 1988)
 Grand Canyon (RCA, 1991)
 Outbreak (Varese Sarabande, 1995)
 Waterworld (MCA, 1995)

With Quincy Jones
  The Hot Rock OST (Prophesy, 1972)
 Roots (A&M, 1977)
 The Color Purple (Qwest, 1986)
 Basie & Beyond (Qwest, 2000)

With Roger Kellaway
 The Roger Kellaway Cello Quartet (A&M, 1971)
 Come to the Meadow (A&M, 1974)
 Nostalgia Suite (Discwasher, 1978)

With Stan Kenton
 Artistry in Jazz (Capitol)
 Stan Kenton Conducts the Los Angeles Neophonic Orchestra  (Capitol, 1965)
 Hair (Capitol, 1969)
 Kenton's Christmas (Capitol, 1970)
 New Horizons Volume 1 (Tantara, 2014)
 New Horizons Volume 2 (Tantara, 2014)

With Julie London
 Julie...At Home (Liberty, 1960)
 All Through the Night: Julie London Sings the Choicest of Cole Porter (Capitol, 1965)

With Henry Mancini
 The Hawaiians (United Artists, 1970)
 Symphonic Soul (RCA Victor, 1975)
 The Jazz Sound from Peter Gunn (Fresh Sound, 1994)

With Harry Partch
 The World of Harry Partch (Columbia, 1969)
 Delusion of the Fury (Sony, 1999)
 Harry Partch: A Portrait (New World, 2015)

With Shorty Rogers
 Bossa Nova (Reprise, 1961)
 Jazz Waltz (Reprise, 1962)
 The Fourth Dimension in Sound (Warner Bros., 1962)
 An Invisible Orchard (RCA, 1997)

With Lalo Schifrin
 More Mission: Impossible (Paramamount, 1969), featured in a chimes solo on "Self-Destruct"
 Rock Requiem (Verve, 1971)
 Gypsies (Tabu, 1978)
 Rush Hour 2 (Varese Sarabande, 2001)
 Rush Hour 3 (Varese Sarabande, 2007)

With Shadowfax
 Shadowfax (Windham Hill, 1982)
 Shadowdance (Windham Hill, 1983)
 Too Far to Whisper (Windham Hill, 1986)
 Folksongs for a Nuclear Village (Capitol, 1988)
 Esperanto (EarthBeat!, 1992)

With George Shearing
 In the Night (Capitol, 1958)
 Latin Lace (Capitol, 1958)
 Shearing On Stage! (Capitol, 1959)
 On the Sunny Side of the Strip (Capitol, 1960)
 The Shearing Touch! (World Record Club, 1964)
 Satin Affair (World Record Club, 1967)

With Frank Sinatra
 Ring-a-Ding Ding! (Reprise, 1961)
 It Might as Well Be Swing (Reprise, 1964)
 Duets (Capitol, 1993)

With The Manhattan Transfer
 The Spirit of St. Louis (Atlantic, 2000)

With Singers Unlimited
 Bossa Nova (Valiant, 1963)
 Just in Time (Pausa, 1978)
 Feelings (Universal, 2007)

With L. Subramaniam
 Fantasy Without Limits (Trend, 1980)
 Blossom (Crusaders, 1981)
 Indian Express (Milestone, 1983)
 Spanish Wave (Milestone, 1983)
 Salaam Bombay! (DRG, 1988)

With Frank Zappa
 Lumpy Gravy (Verve, 1967)
 Orchestral Favorites (Discreet, 1979)
 Läther (Rykodisc, 1996)

With Hans Zimmer
 Broken Arrow (Milan, 1996)
 The Thin Red Line (RCA Victor, 1999)
 The Last Samurai (Elektra, 2003)

With others
 Francisco Aguabella, Dance the Latin Way (Fantasy, 1962)
 Toshiko Akiyoshi & Lew Tabackin Big Band, March of the Tadpoles (RCA, 1977)
 Laurindo Almeida, Virtuoso Guitar (Crystal Clear, 1977)
 Herb Alpert, Just You and Me (A&M, 1976)
 Herb Alpert, Rise (A&M, 1979)
 Paul Anka, Rock Swings (Verve, 2005)
 Klaus Badelt, Pirates of the Caribbean: The Curse of the Black Pearl (Walt Disney, 2003)
 Klaus Badelt, Pirates of the Caribbean (Walt Disney, 2007)
 The Beach Boys, The Beach Boys with the Royal Philharmonic Orchestra (Capitol, 2018)
 Bee Gees, Saturday Night Fever (RSO, 1977)
 Hal Blaine, Psychedelic Percussion (Dunhill, 1967)
 Blondie, Autoamerican (Chrysalis, 1980)
 Terence Boylan, Suzy (Asylum, 1980)
 Brass Fever, Brass Fever (Impulse!, 1975)
 Les Brown, The Explosive Sound of Les Brown and His Band of Renown Swingin' the Masters! (Columbia, 1963)
 Michael Bublé, Call Me Irresponsible (Reprise Records, 2007)
 Bobby Caldwell, Solid Ground (Polydor, 1991)
 Vanessa Carlton, Be Not Nobody (A&M, 2002)
 Les Crane, Desiderata (Warner Bros., 1971)
 Marshall Crenshaw, Jaggedland (429 Records, 2009)
 Dick Dale, Summer Surf (Capitol, 1964)
 Bobby Darin, Venice Blue (Capitol, 1965)
 Sammy Davis Jr. & Count Basie, Our Shining Hour (Jazz Heritage, 1979)
 Dion DiMucci, Born to Be with You (Collectables, 1975)
 Dolenz, Jones, Boyce & Hart, Dolenz, Jones, Boyce & Hart (Capitol, 1976)
 Joao Donato, A Bad Donato (Blue Thumb, 1970)
 Donovan, Slow Down World (Epic, 1976)
 The Doors, Other Voices (Elektra, 1971)
 Sam Cooke, Ain't That Good News (RCA Victor, 1964)
 Duane Eddy, Duane Eddy (Capitol, 1987)
 Danny Elfman, MIB2 (Sony, 2012)
 Danny Elfman, Epic (Sony, 2013)
 David Essex, Be-Bop the Future (Mercury, 1981)
 Mimi Farina & Tom Jans, Take Heart (A&M, 1971)
 Victor Feldman, The Venezuela Joropo (Pacific Jazz, 1967)
 Jerry Fielding, Near East Brass (Command, 1967)
 Ella Fitzgerald, Ella Fitzgerald Sings the Harold Arlen Songbook (Verve, 2001)
 Dominic Frontiere, On Any Sunday (Bell, 1971)
 Ted Gärdestad, Blue Virgin Isles (Polar, 1978)
 Marvin Gaye, Let's Get It On (Tamla, 1973)
 Lowell George, Lightning-Rod Man (Bizarre, 1993)
 Bob Gibson, Bob Gibson (Capitol, 1971)
 Dizzy Gillespie, The New Continent (Limelight, 1965)
 Jackie Gleason, The Now Sound... for Today's Lovers (Capitol, 1968)
 Jerry Goldsmith, Along Came a Spider (Varese Sarabande, 2001)
 Glen Gray, Sounds of the Great Bands! (Capitol, 1958)
 Kathe Green, Kathe Green (Prodigal, 1976)
 Josh Groban, Illuminations (Reprise, 2010)
 Dave Grusin, Cinemagic (GRP, 1987)
 Lani Hall, Hello It's Me (A&M, 1974)
 Cyril Havermans, Cyril (MGM, 1973)
 Lee Hazlewood, Something Special (Light in the Attic, 2015)
 Neal Hefti, Jazz Pops (Reprise, 1962)
 Maurice Jarre, Gorillas in the Mist (MCA, 1988)
 Pete Jolly, Seasons (A&M, 1970)
 Michael Kamen, The Three Musketeers (Hollywood, 1993)
 Michael Kamen, 101 Dalmatians (Walt Disney, 1996)
 Barney Kessel, Contemporary Latin Rhythms (Reprise, 1963)
 John Klemmer, Touch (ABC, 1975)
 Irene Kral, Wonderful Life  (Mainstream, 1965)
 Irene Kral, Kral Space (Catalyst, 1977)
 Diana Krall, Christmas Songs (Verve, 2005)
 Queen Latifah, The Dana Owens Album (A&M, 2004)
 Peggy Lee, Blues Cross Country (Capitol, 1962)
 Peggy Lee, Sugar 'n' Spice (Capitol, 1962)
 Carly Simon, Playing Possum (Elektra, 1975)
 Nils Lofgren, Cry Tough (A&M, 1976)
 Harvey Mandel, Baby Batter (Janus, 1971)
 Shelly Manne, Daktari (Atlantic, 1967)
 Hugh Masekela, Hugh Masekela's Latest (Uni, 1967)
 Dave Mason, Split Coconut (CBS, 1975)
 Lonette McKee, Lonette (Sussex, 1974)
 Carmen McRae, I Am Music (Blue Note, 1975)
 Mike Melvoin, Keys to Your Mind (Liberty, 1966)
 Sergio Mendes, Brasil '88 (RCA, 2002)
 Bette Midler, Bathhouse Betty (Warner Bros., 1998)
 Liza Minnelli, Gently (Angel, 1996)
 Joni Mitchell, Mingus (Asylum, 1979)
 Alphonse Mouzon, The Man Incognito (Blue Note, 1976)
 Maria Muldaur, Waitress in a Donut Shop (Reprise, 1974)
 Gerry Mulligan, The Age of Steam (A&M, 1972)
 Sammy Nestico, This Is the Moment (Fenwood Music, 2002)
 Juice Newton, Quiet Lies (Capitol, 1982)
 Harry Nilsson, Sandman (RCA Victor, 1976)
 Jeffrey Osborne, Stay With Me Tonight (A&M, 1983)
 Jimmy and Carol Owens, The Witness (Light, 1978)
 Freda Payne, Payne & Pleasure (ABC, 1974)
 Van Dyke Parks, Jump! (Warner Bros., 1984)
 Stu Phillips, A Touch of Modern (MGM, 1956)
 Steve Porcaro, Metro (Walt Disney, 1997)
 Gregory Porter, Nat King Cole & Me (Blue Note, 2017)
 John Powell, Mr. & Mrs. Smith (Recall 2005)
 Don Preston, Vile Foamy Ectoplasm (Muffin, 1993)
 Joshua Radin, Underwater (Mom + Pop, 2012)
 Helen Reddy, Ear Candy (Capitol, 1977)
 Howard Roberts, Jaunty-Jolly! (Capitol, 1967)
 Robbie Robertson & Alex North, Carny (Warner Bros., 1980)
 Tommy Roe, We Can Make Music (ABC, 1970)
 Linda Ronstadt, Winter Light (Elektra, 1993)
 Willie Ruff, The Smooth Side of Ruff (Columbia, 1968)
 Buffy Sainte-Marie, Sweet America (ABC, 1976)
 Mongo Santamaria, Afro Roots (Prestige, 1989)
 Diane Schuur, Music Is My Life (Atlantic, 1999)
 Clifford Scott, Lavender Sax (World Pacific, 1964)
 Tom Scott, The Honeysuckle Breeze (Impulse!, 1967)
 Tom Scott, Great Scott! (A&M, 1972)
 Nancy Sinatra, Boots (Reprise, 1966)
 Emitt Rhodes, The American Dreams (A&M, 1970)
 Ravi Shankar, Charly (World Pacific, 1968)
 Ravi Shankar, Shankar Family & Friends (Dark Horse, 1974)
 Judee Sill, Heart Food (Asylum, 2006)
 Joanie Sommers, The Voice of the Sixties! (Warner Bros., 1961)
 Joanie Sommers, Softly, the Brazilian Sound (Warner Bros., 1964)
 Phil Spector, Back to Mono 1958–1969 (Abkco, 1991)
 Gabor Szabo, Wind, Sky and Diamonds (Impulse!, 1967)
 Bob Thiele, Gabor Szabo & Tom Scott, Light My Fire (Impulse!, 1967)
 Vinx, Rooms in My Fatha's House (I.R.S., 1991)
 Wendy Waldman, Wendy Waldman (Warner Bros., 1975)
 Nancy Wilson, Guess Who I Saw Today (Capitol, 2005)
 Popcorn Wylie, Extrasensory Perception (ABC, 1974)
 Daniel Valdez, Mestizo (A&M, 1974)
 David Werner, Imagination Quota (RCA Victor, 1975)
 Gary Wright, Headin' Home (Warner Bros., 1979)

Bibliography

References

External links
 Emil Richards Interview NAMM Oral History Program (2006)

1932 births
2019 deaths
Musicians from Hartford, Connecticut
Military personnel from Hartford, Connecticut
University of Hartford Hartt School alumni
American jazz drummers
American jazz percussionists
American jazz vibraphonists
American session musicians
Conga players
Güiro players
American marimbists
Tambourine players
Timbaleros
Timpanists
Xylophonists
Impulse! Records artists
Uni Records artists
Batá drummers
Djembe players
Maracas players
Bongo players
Tabla players
Tubular bells players
Cimbalom players
Snare drummers
Bass drum players
20th-century American drummers
American male drummers
Jazz musicians from Connecticut
20th-century American male musicians
American male jazz musicians
Del-Fi Records artists